Julian Roy Haines (1944–2017) was an English international lawn and indoor bowler.

Bowls career
Haines bowled for Berkshire and won the National Indoor Pairs in 1974. His finest moment came when he won the Fours Gold Medal at the 1984 World Outdoor Bowls Championship in Aberdeen with Tony Allcock, John Bell and George Turley.

He represented England in the fours, at the 1986 Commonwealth Games in Edinburgh, Scotland.

Personal life
He started a company called Julian Haines Bowls Limited in 1998 which is based at the Bournemouth Indoor Bowls Centre. The company sells bowls goods and provides forums detailing aspects of the sport.

He died on 7 March 2017.

References

2017 deaths
English male bowls players
Bowls World Champions
1944 births
Bowls players at the 1986 Commonwealth Games
Commonwealth Games competitors for England